Michał Przysiężny won the inaugural event by defeating Lukáš Lacko 6–3, 7–5.

Seeds

Draw

Finals

Top half

Bottom half

References
 Main Draw
 Qualifying Draw

Internazionali Tennis Val Gardena Sudtirol - Singles
Internazionali Tennis Val Gardena Südtirol